Stokke Station is a railway station on the Vestfold Line in Stokke, Norway. The station is served with regional trains operated by Vy. The station was built as part of the Vestfold Line in 1881.

External links
Jernbaneverket's entry on Stokke station

Railway stations in Vestfold og Telemark
Railway stations on the Vestfold Line
Railway stations opened in 1881
1881 establishments in Norway
Airport railway stations in Norway